Viktor Korolev (born 1954) is a Russian scientist in the field of mathematical statistics, Professor, Dr. Sc., a professor at the Faculty of Computer Science at the Moscow State University.

He defended the thesis «Limit distributions of random sequences with independent random indices and some of their applications» for the degree of Doctor of Physical and Mathematical Sciences (1994).

Author of 27 books and more than 340 scientific articles.

References

Bibliography

External links
 Annals of the Moscow University
 MSU CMC
 Scientific works of Viktor Korolev
 Scientific works of Viktor Korolev

Russian computer scientists
Russian mathematicians
Living people
1954 births
Academic staff of Moscow State University
Moscow State University alumni